Rubén Noceda (11 May 1931 – 8 April 2007) was a football goalkeeper from Paraguay.

Noceda was born in 1931 in Asunción. He started his career in the youth divisions of Presidente Hayes and made his debut in the first team squad in 1946. He played for Presidente Hayes until 1956 and won the only Paraguayan 1st division title in the club's history in 1952. Noceda also played for Peruvian club Atlético Chalaco.

Noceda was part of the Paraguay national football team that participated in the 1953 Copa America which was eventually won by Paraguay.

Titles

References

1931 births
2007 deaths
Paraguayan footballers
Paraguay international footballers
Paraguayan expatriate footballers
Expatriate footballers in Peru
Atlético Chalaco footballers
Association football goalkeepers